Winnie Gibson (1902-2000) was the second director of the United States Navy Nurse Corps, serving in that position from 1950 to 1954.

Navy Nurse Corps career
Captain Gibson graduated from Seton Hospital, Austin, Texas, in May 1923, and worked in civilian hospitals for seven years. She became a registered nurse in December 1930.

After joining the United States Navy Nurse Corps in 1930, she served at Naval Hospital, Philadelphia, Pennsylvania, and Naval Hospital, New York City. In January 1934, she attended the School of Nursing, Graduate School of Medicine at University of Pennsylvania in Philadelphia for instruction in anesthesia. In May 1934 she was assigned as Operating Room Supervisor and Anesthetist at Naval Hospital, New York City, and was subsequently assigned to the same duties at Quantico, Virginia. After her tour on the Relief, she was assigned as Anesthetist at Naval Hospital, Mare Island, California, and then as Anesthetist and Operating Room Supervisor at Naval Hospital, Pearl Harbor, Hawaii. She was at Naval Hospital, Pearl Harbor, on 7 December 1941. In following tours, she was assigned as Chief Nurse at the Naval Hospitals in Jacksonville, Florida; Annapolis, Maryland; and Houston, Texas.

Her last tour before being selected as Director was as Chief Nurse, U. S. Naval Hospital, Naval Medical Center, Guam, Marianas Islands.

Director

During the Korean War, Captain Gibson presided over a Nurse Corps that was required to involuntarily recall Reserve nurses at the rate of 125 per week and "freeze" those on active duty.
She retired from active duty on 1 May 1954.

Later life
Gibson retired to Ohio, then to Texas. She died on  21 July 2000, and is buried at Restland Memorial Park in Dallas, Texas.

Further reading
 "Winnie Gibson Palmer DeWitt", Navy Medicine 2001, 1:26.
 "MILITARY SERVICES SEEK MORE NURSES; At Convention, Heads of Army, Navy and Air Units Call on Young Women to Join", Washington Post, June 24, 1953.
 "Heads Navy Nurses", Stars and Stripes, 11 Feb 1950.

 Fact filled, extensively researched account of the evolution of the roles of women in the United States Navy, treating the parallel and intertwined paths of the Navy Nurse Corps and the WAVES. About one-third of the pages are devoted to notes and bibliography.

External links
Nurses and the U.S. Navy -- Overview and Special Image Selection Naval Historical Center

1902 births
2000 deaths
American nursing administrators
Female wartime nurses
United States Navy Nurse Corps officers
United States Navy personnel of the Korean War
Female United States Navy officers
Korean War nurses
Female United States Navy nurses in World War II